In 1984, several new characters made their debuts on Coronation Street, including Bill Webster and his daughter Debbie Webster.

Bill Webster

Debbie Webster

Debbie Webster, played by Sue Devaney, is the daughter of Bill Webster, and younger sister of Kevin Webster. She made her first on screen appearance on 11 June 1984. Debbie left six months later on 9 January 1985. Devaney returned to the role in 2019 for five episodes, following a 34-year absence. On 28 July 2020, it was announced that Devaney would return again in 2020 on a permanent basis.

Debbie is Kevin's younger sister and arrives not long after her brother's arrival. After leaving school with no qualifications, Debbie worked at Jim's Cafe. She dates biker Daz Isherwood, much to her father's consternation. In January 1985, Debbie moves to Southampton with Bill and his new wife, Elaine. Off screen, Debbie trained as a hairdresser. In 2001, Kevin disappears when his then ex-wife Sally was planning to marry Danny Hargreaves and was found staying with Debbie in Southampton. Debbie was mentioned again in December 2009 when Kevin and Bill discuss Sally, now married to Kevin again and having treatment for breast cancer, the same disease that killed their mother Alison and how it affected them as children. The following year, after his daughter Sophie ran away from home with her girlfriend, Sian Powers. Kevin phoned Debbie and asked her if she had heard from Sophie. In September 2011, Debbie phones Rosie and tells her that she has bought a villa in Turkey and invites Kevin to visit and bring his baby son Jack. Kevin goes to visit Debbie in November 2016.

After more than 30 years away from Weatherfield, Debbie makes a return to visit Kevin. Within minutes, she and Abi Franklin cross wires until Kevin introduces Debbie as his sister. Debbie informs Kevin that their aunt, Vi has died and she attends the will reading. Debbie reveals that she is the sole beneficiary of their aunt's will and tells Kevin she has inherited £200,000 and plans to give it to him, which results in Kevin nearly choking in shock. Kevin then mulls over the idea.

References

, Coronation Street
1984
Coronation Street